Bardolph or Bardolf is a surname and, in Middle English, a personal name. It originates from the Continental Germanic Bartholf or Bardwulf, from bard meaning "axe" and wulf meaning wolf, via the Old French Bardol(f). It may refer to:

People
Hugh Bardulf or Bardolf (died c. 1203), English administrator and royal justice
William Bardolf (leader) (died 1275 or 1276), English baronial leader
John Bardolf, 3rd Baron Bardolf (1314–1363), son of Sir Thomas Bardolf, 2nd Baron Bardolf
William Bardolf, 4th Baron Bardolf (1349-1386), son of the 3rd baron
Thomas Bardolf, 5th Baron Bardolf (died 1408), rebel against King Henry IV
William Phelip, 6th Baron Bardolf (1383–1441), Baron Bardolf in right of his wife Joan, daughter of the 5th baron
Doug Bardolph (1893-1951), Australian journalist, trade unionist and politician, brother of Ken
Ken Bardolph (1895-1964), Australian politician, brother of Douglas

Fictional characters
Bardolph (Shakespeare character), an alcoholic thief in four of Shakespeare's plays

References